The 2014–15 season was the 67th season of competitive football in Israel, and the 89th season under the Israeli Football Association, established in 1928, during the British Mandate.

The season saw Maccabi Tel Aviv winning all three major trophies, the league, the State Cup and the Toto Cup, the first time all three trophies are won by one club during a season.

At the end of the season, Israel hosted the 2015 UEFA Women's Under-19 Championship, the fourth official tournament hosted by Israel (following the 1964 AFC Asian Cup, the 2000 UEFA European Under-16 Championship and the 2013 UEFA European Under-21 Championship), and the first ever women's football tournament was hosted by Israel.

IFA Competitions

League Competitions

Men's senior competitions

Women's senior competitions

Youth competitions

Cup Competitions

International Club Competitions

Champions League

Second qualifying round

|}
|}

Third qualifying round

|}

Europa League

Second qualifying round

|}

Third qualifying round

|}

Play-off round

|}

Women's Champions League

Qualifying round (Group 8)

National teams

National team

UEFA Euro 2016 qualifying Group B

2014–15 matches

Women's national team

2015 Women's World Cup qualification (group 3)

2014–15 matches

U-21 National team

2015 European U-21 qualifying round (Group 8)

2014–15 matches

U-19 National team

2015 UEFA European Under-19 Championship qualification

2014–15 matches

U-19 Women's National team

2015 UEFA Women's Under-19 Championship

2014–15 matches

 In addition to these matches, the national team competed in the Women's League, finishing 5th, with 8 victories, 4 draws and 12 losses, scoring 69 goals and conceding 36 goals.

U-17 National team

2015 UEFA European Under-17 Championship

Qualifying round (Group 7)

Elite round (Group 1)

2014–15 matches

U-17 Women's national team

2015 European U-17 qualifying round (Group 10)

2014–15 results

Notes

References

 
Seasons in Israeli football